Grishchenko is a surname. Notable people with the surname include:

Vladimir Grishchenko (born 1972), Russian footballer
Sergey Grishchenko (1947–2000), Soviet alpine skier

See also
Grishchenkov, a Russian surname

Russian-language surnames